Sticks and Stones is an album by American pianist Dave Grusin with his brother Don Grusin. It was released in 1988, recorded for the GRP label. The album reached No. 14 on the Billboard Contemporary Jazz chart.

Track listing
All tracks composed by Dave Grusin; except where indicated
"Birds with Long Legs" – 5:03
"Pico Pica" (Don Grusin) – 4:57
"Sailing at Night" (Don Grusin) – 4:19
"River Song" (Dave Grusin, Don Grusin) – 5:10
"Sticks and Stones" (Dave Grusin, Don Grusin) – 6:08
"Glissade" – 5:18
"Good Ol' Boys" (Don Grusin) – 7:28
"This Little Pig's Got the Blues" (Don Grusin) – 5:28
"Dog Heaven" (Don Grusin) – 4:49
"Southern Wind" (Dori Caymmi) – 4:15
"North-Tribal Step Dance"

Personnel
Dave Grusin and Don Grusin – all instruments
 Yamaha DXIIFD, DX7, TX816, TX7, and RX5 Drum Machine
 Roland D-550, MKS20, and Super Jupiter
 Sequential Circuits Prophet V.S. and Studio 440 Drum Machine
 Steinway and Yamaha pianos
Atari 1040ST with Hybrid Arts SmpteTrack software
Emulator - Emax Sampler
Dori Caymmi - vocals on "Southern Wind"

Charts

References

External links
Dave Grusin-Sticks and Stones at Discogs
The Grusin Brothers-Sticks and Stones at AllMusic

1988 albums
GRP Records albums
Dave Grusin albums